Planar Systems, Inc. is an American digital display manufacturing corporation with a facility in Hillsboro, Oregon. Founded in 1983 as a spin-off from Tektronix, it was the first U.S. manufacturer of electroluminescent (EL) digital displays. Planar currently makes a variety of other specialty displays, and is an independent subsidiary of Leyard Optoelectronic Co. since 2015.The headquarters, leadership team and employees still remain in Hillsboro,Oregon.

History

1980s
Planar was founded on May 23, 1983 by Jim Hurd, Chris King, John Laney and others as a spin-off from the Solid State Research and Development Group of the Beaverton, Oregon, based Tektronix. In 1986, a division spun off from Planar to work on projection technology and formed InFocus.

1990s
In 1991, Planar purchased FinLux, a competitor in Espoo, Finland.  This location now serves as the company's European headquarters. Planar's executives took the company public in 1993, listing the stock on the NASDAQ boards Planar acquired Tektronix's avionics display business, creating the short-lived Planar Advance in 1994. Standish Industries, a manufacturer of flat panel LCDs in Lake Mills, Wisconsin, was sold to Planar in 1997. This plant was closed in 2002 as worldwide LCD manufacturing shifted to East Asian countries.

2000s

On April 23, 2002, DOME Imaging Systems was purchased by Planar and became the company's medical business unit. Planar acquired Clarity Visual Systems (founded by former InFocus employees) on September 12, 2006, now referred to as the Control Room and Signage business unit. On June 19, 2006, Planar acquired Runco International, a leading brand in the high-end, custom home theater market. On August 6, 2008, Planar sold its medical business unit to NDS Surgical Imaging.

2010s
In November 2012, Planar announced the sale of its electroluminescent business to Beneq Oy, a supplier of production and research equipment for thin film coatings.  Under the terms of the transaction, consideration consists of a $6.5 million base purchase price, of which $3.9 million was paid in cash at closing and $2.6 million was paid in the form of a promissory note. Planar was purchased by Leyard Optoelectronic Co. of China in 2015 for $157 million. It became a subsidiary after formerly trading on the NASDAQ under the symbol PLNR.

In November 2016, Planar announced that it was to enter a merger agreement with NaturalPoint Inc., which sells infrared point tracking systems for use on CGI movie sets (Optitrack), and home use both for assisted computing (Smartnav) and computer gaming (TrackIR). The merger was finalized in January 2017. NaturalPoint will remain a separate business with its own executive team, customers, and market initiatives.

2020s

The company has also completed several mission-critical deployments for corporations, governments, utilities, security and traffic authorities and more. In 2020, a nearly 32-foot-long, 5-foot-high Planar® TVF Series LED video wall was added to Lea County Communication Authority (LCCA)’s Lea County 911 Call Center.

Planar completed the latest of three installations at the University of Oregon. The addition of Planar® CarbonLight™ CLI Flex™ pliable LED video wall displays, custom designed into two curved LED installations, at Matthew Knight Arena follows the companies deployments at the university’s Hatfield-Dowlin Complex in 2013 and Student Recreation Center in 2015.

The company also expanded its presence at Clemson University in Clemson, South Carolina by adding an impressive collection of 126 Planar LCD displays and two Planar LED video walls in the Wilbur O. and Ann Powers College of Business. 200 Planar displays also appear in the university’s four-story Watt Family Innovation Center following an installation in 2016.

On March 31, 2020, Planar launched a competitive, multi-year leasing program called Planar® EverNew™. The program simplifies the buying process by enabling customers to lease Planar display solutions at a fixed monthly cost.

On June 11, 2020, Planar was recognized as a BEST Award winner by Commercial Integrator magazine. During the months of November and December, Planar also received an Innovative Product Award, DIGI Award and New Product Award from Sound & Video Contractor magazine, Digital Signage Magazine and Campus Technology magazine.

On October 6, 2020, Planar introduced a lifetime limited warranty for LED displays called Planar® EverCare™. The program is designed to provide customers with complete confidence in their LED video wall purchase while reducing their lifetime cost-of-ownership. Products included in the program include Planar® TVF Series  and Planar® TVF Complete™ LED video walls  deployed in North America.

On November 10, 2020, Planar expanded their US government division  to enhance the company’s product security program to further adapt products and processes to best meet the product security needs of customers.

Products
 LED Video Walls 
 LCD Video Walls 
 Large Format LCD Displays 
 Collaboration and Touch Displays 
 Transparent OLED Displays 
 Outdoor LED Solutions 
 Custom LED Solutions 
 Video Processing 
 Desktop and Touch Screen Monitors 
 Accessories

Operations
Planar currently assembles and services videowalls, projectors, and other displays in Hillsboro. Planar's EL manufacturing operations were consolidated into Planar's Espoo, Finland facility in 2002. Additional large-format displays are assembled and integrated in Albi, France.

Leyard Merger
On November 27, 2015, Planar closed its sale to become a subsidiary of Leyard Optoelectronic Co., a Chinese LED display product corporation. Headquarters operations for Planar remain in Beaverton, OR following the sale.

Locations
In addition to its Oregon, U.S. headquarters, Planar has worldwide reach. Its sales offices are located in Europe, North America, and Asia. It has manufacturing facilities in France, North America, and Finland.

See also
Silicon Forest
List of companies based in Oregon

References

External links
Hoover's Profile of Planar Systems
International Directory of Company Histories, Volume 61 (1990) via Answers.com
Planar Systems topic at New York Times

Electronics companies of the United States
Companies based in Hillsboro, Oregon
Manufacturing companies based in Oregon
Display technology companies
Electronics companies established in 1983
Companies formerly listed on the Nasdaq
1983 establishments in Oregon
1993 initial public offerings
2015 mergers and acquisitions
American subsidiaries of foreign companies
Corporate spin-offs